Euxoamorpha is a genus of moths of the family Noctuidae.

Selected species
Euxoamorpha ceciliae Angulo & Rodríguez, 1998
Euxoamorpha eschata Franclemont, 1950
Euxoamorpha ingoufii (Mabille, 1885)
Euxoamorpha mendosica (Hampson, 1903)
Euxoamorpha molibdoida (Staudinger, 1899)

References
Natural History Museum Lepidoptera genus database

Noctuinae